The Comet River is a river located in Central Queensland, Australia.

Geography 
Formed by the confluence of the Brown River and Clematis Creek, the Comet River rises in the Expedition Range, north of Expedition National Park and south of Rolleston. The river flows north, joined by seventeen tributaries, and splits as an anabranch on multiple occasions. The river flows through the Teatree Waterhole and Comet towards its confluence with the Nogoa River to form the Mackenzie River. The river descends  over its  course. The river is crossed by the Dawson Highway at Rolleston and the Capricorn Highway at Comet.
The river traverses elevations between 144 and 1,243 m above mean sea level.

Water management 
The Comet River Weir is the main water storage facility on the river, with a surface area of  when full. In the late 1990s the river was the site for a proposed new dam, although it was never built.

History 
Wadja (also known as Wadjigu, Wadya, Wadjainngo, Mandalgu, and Wadjigun) is an Australian Aboriginal language in Central Queensland. The language region includes  the local government areas of the Aboriginal Shire of Woorabinda and Central Highlands Region, including the Blackdown Tablelands. the Comet River, and the Expedition Range, and the towns of Woorabinda, Springsure and Rolleston.

See also

References

Rivers of Queensland
Central Queensland